Acetaldehyde dehydrogenases are dehydrogenase enzymes which catalyze the conversion of acetaldehyde into acetic acid. The oxidation of acetaldehyde to acetate can be summarized as follows:

Acetaldehyde + NAD+ + Coenzyme A ↔ Acetyl-CoA + NADH + H+

In humans, there are three known genes which encode this enzymatic activity, ALDH1A1, ALDH2, and the more recently discovered ALDH1B1 (also known as ALDH5).  These enzymes are members of the larger class of aldehyde dehydrogenases.

The CAS number for this type of the enzyme is [9028-91-5].

Structure
Cysteine-302 is one of three consecutive Cys residues and is crucial to the enzyme's catalytic function. The residue is alkylated by iodoacetamide in both the cytosolic and mitochondrial isozymes, with modifications to Cys-302 indicative of catalytic activity with other residues. Furthermore, the preceding sequence Gln-Gly-Gln-Cys is conserved in both isozymes for both human and horse, which is consistent with Cys-302 being crucial to catalytic function.

As discovered by site-directed mutagenesis, glutamate-268 is a key component of liver acetaldehyde dehydrogenase and is also critical to catalytic activity. Since activity in mutants could not be restored by addition of general bases, it's suggested that the residue functions as a general base for activation of the essential Cys-302 residue.

In bacteria, acylating acetaldehyde dehydrogenase forms a bifunctional heterodimer with metal-dependent 4-hydroxy-2-ketovalerate aldolase. Utilized in the bacterial degradation of toxic aromatic compounds, the enzyme's crystal structure indicates that intermediates are shuttled directly between active sites through a hydrophobic intermediary channel, providing an unreactive environment in which to move the reactive acetaldehyde intermediate from the aldolase active site to the acetaldehyde dehydrogenase active site. Such communication between proteins allows for the efficient transfer substrates from one active site to the next.

Evolution
Although the two isozymes (ALDH1 and ALDH2) do not share a common subunit, the homology between the human ALDH1 and ALDH2 proteins is 66% at the coding nucleotide level and 69% at the amino acid level, which is found to be lower than the 91% homology between human ALDH1 and horse ALDH1. Such a finding is consistent with evidence suggesting the early evolutionary divergence between cytosolic and mitochondrial isozymes, as seen in the 50% homology between pig mitochondrial and cytosolic aspartate aminotransferases.

Role in metabolism of alcohol

In the liver, ethanol is converted into harmless acetic acid (the main acid in vinegar) by a two-step process. In the first step, ethanol is converted to acetaldehyde by alcohol dehydrogenase. In the second step, the acetaldehyde is converted to acetic acid by acetaldehyde dehydrogenase. Acetaldehyde is more toxic than alcohol and is responsible for many hangover symptoms.

About 50% of people of Northeast Asian descent have a dominant mutation in their acetaldehyde dehydrogenase gene, making this enzyme less effective, which causes the alcohol flush reaction, also known as Asian flush syndrome. A similar mutation is found in about 5–10% of blond-haired blue-eyed people of Northern European descent. In these people, acetaldehyde accumulates after drinking alcohol, leading to symptoms of acetaldehyde poisoning, including the characteristic flushing of the skin and increased heart and respiration rates. Other symptoms can include severe abdominal and urinary tract cramping, hot and cold flashes, profuse sweating, and profound malaise. Individuals with deficient acetaldehyde dehydrogenase activity are far less likely to become alcoholics, but seem to be at a greater risk of liver damage, alcohol-induced asthma, and contracting cancers of the oro-pharynx and esophagus due to acetaldehyde overexposure.
 This demonstrates that many of ethanol's toxic effects are mediated via the acetaldehyde metabolite and can therefore be mitigated by substances such as fomepizole which effectively reduces the conversion rate of ethanol to acetaldehyde in vivo.

ALDH2, which has a lower KM for acetaldehydes than ALDH1 and acts predominantly in the mitochondrial matrix, is the main enzyme in acetaldehyde metabolism and has three genotypes. A single point mutation (G → A) at exon 12 of the ALDH2 gene causes a replacement of glutamine with lysine at residue 487, resulting in the ALDH2K enzyme.  ALDH2K has an increased KM for NAD+, rendering it virtually inactive at cellular concentrations of NAD+. Since ALDH2 is a randomized tetramer, the hetero-mutated genotype is reduced to only 6% activity compared to wild type, while homo-mutated genotypes have virtually zero enzyme activity. The ALDH2-deficient subunit is dominant in hybridization with a wild type subunit, resulting in inactivation of the isozyme by interfering with catalytic activity and increasing turnover. ALDH2 genetic variation has been closely correlated with alcohol dependence, with heterozygotes at a reduced risk compared to wild type homozygotes and individual homozygotes for the ALDH2-deficient at a very low risk for alcoholism.

The drug disulfiram (Antabuse) prevents the oxidation of acetaldehyde to acetic acid and is used in the treatment of alcoholism.  ALDH1 is strongly inhibited by disulfiram, while ALDH2 is resistant to its effect. The cysteine residue at 302 in ALDH1 and 200 in ALDH2 is implicated as a disulfiram binding site on the enzyme and serves as a disulfiram sensitive thiol site. Covalent binding of disulfiram to the thiol blocks the binding of one of the cysteine residues with iodoacetamide, thereby inactivating the enzyme and significantly lowering catalytic activity. Activity can be recovered by treatment with 2-mercaptoethanol, although not with glutathione.

Metronidazole (Flagyl), which is used to treat certain parasitic infections as well as pseudomembranous colitis, causes similar effects to disulfiram.  Coprine (which is an amino acid found in certain coprinoid mushrooms) metabolizes in vivo to 1-aminocyclopropanol which causes similar effects as well.

Role in fat metabolism
ALDH1 is involved in the metabolism of Vitamin A. Animal models suggest that absence of the gene is associated with protection against visceral adiposity.

See also 
 Disulfiram-like drug
 Oxidoreductase

References

External links 
 

EC 1.2.1